Bruce W. Shore (1935 — 9 January 2021) was an American theoretical physicist known for his works in atomic physics and the theory of the interaction of light with matter.

Biography 
In 1960, at the Massachusetts Institute of Technology, Shore defended his doctoral thesis in experimental nuclear chemistry. The next decade he worked at the Harvard Observatory and the Kansas State University. In 1970, he joined Lawrence Livermore National Laboratory, where he worked until his retirement in 2001. In the 1980s, Shore spent his sabbaticals lecturing at Imperial College London. Since 1991, he has been closely collaborating with researchers from the Technical University of Kaiserslautern, and since the late 2000s, from the Technical University of Darmstadt. After receiving the Humboldt Prize in 1997, he spent a whole year in Germany. He was also an editor of the Journal of the Optical Society of America B and Reviews of Modern Physics. He was elected a Fellow of the American Physical Society and the Optica.

In the 1970s, Shore was engaged in secret research on laser isotope separation. In 1975, he discovered the phenomenon of population trapping, which leads to a decrease in the efficiency of ionization of atoms when they are excited by an additional laser. In 1983, he developed the Morris—Shore transformation, which makes it possible to represent a complex system of excitations of energy levels of a quantum system through a set of independent energy levels and two-level systems. The results of Shore's work in the 1970s—1980s were summarized in his two-volume monograph The Theory of Coherent Atomic Excitation. His research since the early 1990s was summarized in his 2011 book Manipulating Quantum Structure Using Laser Pulses.

He was married to Randi, with whom he had five children.

Select publications 
 Books
 
 
 
 

 Scientific papers

Sources 
 

1935 births

2021 deaths
20th-century American physicists
Theoretical physicists
Harvard College Observatory people
Kansas State University faculty
Lawrence Livermore National Laboratory staff
Humboldt Research Award recipients
Fellows of the American Physical Society
Fellows of Optica (society)
Massachusetts Institute of Technology alumni